Rhythm Romance is the fifth album by Detroit Rock band The Romantics, released on Nemperor Records in 1985.

Track listing 
All tracks written by Wally Palmar, Coz Canler and Mike Skill, except where noted.

Personnel
 Wally Palmar - lead vocals, rhythm guitar, harmonica
 Coz Canler - lead guitar, backing vocals
 Mike Skill - bass, backing vocals
 David Petratos - drums, backing vocals
Additional Personnel
 Pete Solley - keyboards, mixing, production
 Gordon Fordyce - production, additional recording, mixing
 Ted Stein - additional recording, additional mixing
 Mike Fuller - mastering

Notes 

1985 albums
The Romantics albums